Amara Muzik is a music label with rights to some of the latest top Odia, Gujarati, Bengali and Chhattisgarhi music.

History
The company was founded in 2015 by Naveen Bhandari who now serves as the CEO, Managing Director of the company. It is headquartered at Chennai, India. In 2015 the company made their catalogue available worldwide through online digital stores including YouTube, iTunes, Apple Music, Deezer, Spotify, Google Play, Amazon music, JioSaavn, Gaana etc. and on mVAS (WAP, IVR, RBT) across telecom operators. In the year 2016, Amara Muzik diversified its market in Bengal.

In the year 2016, Amara Muzik acquired the audio-video catalogue of Micro Broadcasting Corporation (MBC) for an undisclosed amount. The catalogue consists of 160 Odia songs acquired for a perpetual tenure.

In April 2016, Amara Muzik launched the music of one of the most anticipated Odia Movie in Agastya 

In September 2017, Amara Muzik Odia channel crosses a milestone of 1,00,000 subscribers on YouTube, the popular video-sharing website.

In the Year 2017, Amara Muzik forayed into 2 other regional languages - Chattisgarhi and Rajasthani. They also started acquiring and promoting Bengali Shortfilms.

In the Year 2018, Amara Muzik expanded into a production wing for producing movies in Odia and Chattisgarhi languages and named it Amara Studios. Amara Studios has announced 6 movies both in Odia and Chattisgarhi.

In the Year 2021, Amara Muzik started acquiring Content in the Gujarati space with the Likes of Jignesh Barot , Rohit Thakor and more .

Short Films Released by Amara Muzik
Following are the list of notable Short Films by Amara Muzik.

Music Albums Released by Amara Muzik
Following are the list of notable music albums by Amara Muzik.

Film music released in Amara Muzik

Following are the list of notable music albums Released by Amara Muzik.

References

External links
 Facebook
 Twitter

Indian record labels
Companies based in Chennai
Indian companies established in 2015
Record labels established in 2015
2015 establishments in Tamil Nadu